Anem may refer to:
 Anem (ancient city), a city mentioned in the Bible
 Anêm language, a language of Papua New Guinea

See also 
 Anam (disambiguation)
 Anim (disambiguation)